Charles Adams (2 November 1753 – 15 November 1821) was a British politician who served as the Tory MP for Weymouth and Melcombe Regis between 1801 and 1812.

He voted against the Convention of Cintra.

References 

Members of the Parliament of the United Kingdom for Weymouth and Melcombe Regis
Adams, Charles (MP)
UK MPs 1801–1802
UK MPs 1802–1806
UK MPs 1806–1807
UK MPs 1807–1812
UK MPs 1812–1818
UK MPs 1818–1820
1753 births
1821 deaths
Tory members of the Parliament of the United Kingdom